An incomplete series of events which happened in Italy in 1616:

 Action of 29 April 1616
 The Church of St. Teresa is built in Turin

Births
 Count Carlo Cesare Malvasia (died 1693)
 Anna Gonzaga (died 1684)
 Carlo Dolci (died 1686)
 Bernardo Cavallino (died 1656)
 Giacomo Castelvetro (born 1546)
 Luigi Pellegrini Scaramuccia (died 1680)
 Pierfrancesco Cittadini (died 1681)
 Giovan Antonio de' Rossi, architect (died 1695)
 March Maurizio Cazzati, composer (died 1678)
 Juan Bautista Antonelli , military engineer (born 1547)

Deaths
 Matteo Perez d'Aleccio
 Matthia Ferrabosco
 Bernardino Realino

References